Jun'ichirō, Junichirō, Junichiro or Junichirou (written: 純一郎 or 潤一郎) is a masculine Japanese given name. Notable people with the name include:

, Japanese primatologist
, Japanese medical researcher and psychiatrist
, Japanese politician and Prime Minister of Japan
Junichiro Kono, Japanese-American electrical and computer engineer
, Japanese writer
, Japanese politician

Japanese masculine given names